Funiscala is a genus of small sea snails, marine gastropod molluscs in the family Epitoniidae, commonly known as wentletraps.

Species
Species within the genus Funiscala include:
 Funiscala maxwelli Finlay, 1930
 † Funiscala nympha Hutton, 1885
 † Funiscala speyeri Sacco, 1890

References

 Powell A. W. B., New Zealand Mollusca, William Collins Publishers Ltd, Auckland, New Zealand 1979 

Epitoniidae